(born November 5, 1976 in Kyoto) is a Japanese wrestler who won the bronze medal in the Men's Freestyle 60 kg at the 2004 Summer Olympics.

Awards
Tokyo Sports
Wrestling Special Award (2004)

References

1976 births
Living people
Olympic wrestlers of Japan
Wrestlers at the 2004 Summer Olympics
Olympic bronze medalists for Japan
Olympic medalists in wrestling
Japanese male sport wrestlers
Medalists at the 2004 Summer Olympics
21st-century Japanese people